Pierre-Paul Guieysse, (May 11, 1841 – May 19, 1914) was a French Socialist politician. He was Minister of the Colonies in the French Cabinet headed by Léon Bourgeois between 1895 and 1896.

Life
He was born in Lorient, Brittany, of a Protestant family. He trained as a hydrographic engineer, working for the navy, but developed scholarly and political interests, becoming a specialist in Egyptology and being active in leftist politics. In May 1900 he co-founded the newspaper La Dépêche de Lorient.

Guieyesse was elected to the Chamber of Deputies as a Radical and Republican Deputy for Morbihan between 1890 and 1910. He was active in the debate over the 1905 French law on the Separation of the Churches and the State, to which  he proposed an amendment. He was also active in the promotion of legislation to make pension contributions compulsory.

Guieysse was active in the social Protestant movement, as were other Musée social members such as Charles Gide (1847–1932), Édouard Gruner (1849–1933), Henri Monod (1843–1911) and Jules Siegfried (1837–1922).
Guiyesse was also president of the Bleus de Bretagne (Breton Blues) a society of liberal and anticlerical Bretons. He played the dominant role in organizing the erection of the controversial statue of Ernest Renan in Tréguier.

From November 1895 to April 1896 he was Minister of Colonies, in the Bourgeois government.

Marcel Guieysse, one of his sons, became a militant Breton nationalist and collaborator during World War II.

Political career

Local politics
General Counsel of Morbihan from 1881 to 1889

National Deputy for Morbihan
Morbihan: February 9, 1890 - October 14, 1893
Morbihan: August 20, 1893 - May 31, 1898
Morbihan: May 8, 1898 - May 31, 1902
Morbihan: 11 May 1902 - May 31, 1906
Morbihan: May 20, 1906 - May 31, 1910

References

Sources

1841 births
1914 deaths
Politicians from Lorient
French Protestants
Radical Party (France) politicians
French Ministers of Overseas France
Members of the 5th Chamber of Deputies of the French Third Republic
Members of the 6th Chamber of Deputies of the French Third Republic
Members of the 7th Chamber of Deputies of the French Third Republic
Members of the 8th Chamber of Deputies of the French Third Republic
Members of the 9th Chamber of Deputies of the French Third Republic
Bleus de Bretagne members